Elections to North Down Borough Council were held on 20 May 1981 on the same day as the other Northern Irish local government elections. The election used four district electoral areas to elect a total of 20 councillors.

Election results

Note: "Votes" are the first preference votes.

Districts summary

|- class="unsortable" align="centre"
!rowspan=2 align="left"|Ward
! % 
!Cllrs
! %
!Cllrs
! %
!Cllrs
! %
!Cllrs
! %
!Cllrs
! %
!Cllrs
!rowspan=2|TotalCllrs
|- class="unsortable" align="center"
!colspan=2 bgcolor="" | Alliance
!colspan=2 bgcolor="" | DUP
!colspan=2 bgcolor="" | UUP
!colspan=2 bgcolor="" | UPUP
!colspan=2 bgcolor="" | UPNI
!colspan=2 bgcolor="white"| Others
|-
|align="left"|Area A
|bgcolor="#F6CB2F"|26.4
|bgcolor="#F6CB2F"|1
|19.3
|1
|18.7
|1
|7.6
|0
|10.3
|1
|17.7
|1
|5
|-
|align="left"|Area B
|15.0
|1
|bgcolor="#D46A4C"|36.7
|bgcolor="#D46A4C"|2
|11.3
|0
|29.1
|2
|0.0
|0
|7.9
|0
|5
|-
|align="left"|Area C
|bgcolor="#F6CB2F"|31.7
|bgcolor="#F6CB2F"|2
|21.3
|1
|23.8
|1
|23.2
|1
|0.0
|0
|0.0
|0
|5
|-
|align="left"|Area D
|30.1
|2
|15.3
|1
|bgcolor="40BFF5"|41.1
|bgcolor="40BFF5"|2
|9.9
|0
|3.5
|0
|0.0
|0
|5
|- class="unsortable" class="sortbottom" style="background:#C9C9C9"
|align="left"| Total
|25.2
|6
|23.7
|5
|22.6
|4
|17.6
|3
|3.8
|1
|7.1
|1
|20
|-
|}

Districts results

Area A

1977: 2 x Alliance, 1 x UUP, 1 x UPNI, 1 x Independent Unionist
1981: 1 x Alliance, 1 x UUP, 1 x UPNI, 1 x DUP, 1 x Independent Unionist
1977-1981 Change: DUP gain from Alliance

Area B

1977: 2 x UUP, 1 x DUP, 1 x Alliance, 1 x Vanguard
1981: 2 x DUP, 2 x UPUP, 1 x Alliance
1977-1981 Change: UPUP (two seats) and DUP gain from UUP (two seats) and Vanguard

Area C

1977: 2 x Alliance, 2 x UUP, 1 x Vanguard
1981: 2 x Alliance, 1 x UUP, 1 x UPUP, 1 x DUP
1977-1981 Change: UPUP and DUP gain from UUP and Vanguard

Area D

1977: 2 x UUP, 2 x Alliance, 1 x UUUP
1981: 2 x UUP, 2 x Alliance, 1 x DUP
1977-1981 Change: DUP gain from UUUP

References

North Down Borough Council elections
North Down